Vijay Nambisan was a poet, writer, critic and journalist from India writing in English. He won First Prize in the first All India Poetry Competition in 1990 organized by The Poetry Society (India) in collaboration with the British Council. He died in 10th August 2017.

Biography
Vijay Nambisan was co-author of the book Gemini with Jeet Thayil and Dom Moraes. Gemini was Thayil's debut book of poetry. Nambisan’s own independent first book was Language as an Ethic. Nambisan was adjudged the first ever All India Poetry Prize winner in 1988 for his poem Madras Central.  He was 54 years old when he died.

Personal life
Vijay Nambisan graduated from IIT Madras, Chennai. He married the novelist and doctor Kavery Nambisan.

Bibliography

Books

 Language as an Ethic (Essays) New Delhi: Penguin Books, India 2003. 
 Bihar is in the Eyes of the Beholder (Reflection) (Poetry in English). New Delhi: Viking, India 2000. 
 Gemini (Poems). New Delhi: Viking Books, India 1992.
 '’Puntanam and Melpattur : Two Measures of Bhakti'’ (Religion), Penguin Books, India New Delhi (2009).

Online references
Book Reviews in DNA by Vijay Nambisan
‘’Reasons of Belonging’’  -“Fourteen Contemporary Indian Poets”  by Ranjit Hoskote

See also

 Kaveri Nambisan – A Biography
 Indian Poets Writing in English
 The Poetry Society (India)

Notes

20th-century births
2017 deaths
Indian male poets
English-language poets from India
Indian male journalists
Year of birth missing
Malayali people
All India Poetry Prize